Tindallia magadiensis is a Gram-positive, alkaliphilic, anaerobic and non-spore-forming bacterium from the genus of Tindallia which has been isolated from soda deposits from the Lake Magadi in Kenya.

References

Clostridiaceae
Bacteria described in 1999
Bacillota